Robert Milczarek (born 28 November 1983) is a Polish professional volleyball player. He was a member of the Poland national team in 2005. At the professional club level, he plays for PGE Skra Bełchatów.

Career

Clubs
Milczarek spent the 2013/2014 season playing for LOTOS Trefl Gdańsk. In 2014 he moved to MKS Banimex Będzin where he played as a libero. On 5 June 2015 for the third time in his career he came back to Skra Bełchatów. On 7 February 2016 alongside PGE Skra he won the Polish Cup after beating ZAKSA in the final. In April 2016 he was a member of the same team which won a bronze medal of the Polish Championship.

Honours

Clubs
 CEV Champions League
  2011/2012 – with PGE Skra Bełchatów
 National championships
 2004/2005  Polish Cup, with PGE Skra Bełchatów
 2004/2005  Polish Championship, with PGE Skra Bełchatów
 2005/2006  Polish Cup, with PGE Skra Bełchatów
 2005/2006  Polish Championship, with PGE Skra Bełchatów
 2006/2007  Polish Cup, with PGE Skra Bełchatów
 2006/2007  Polish Championship, with PGE Skra Bełchatów
 2007/2008  Polish Championship, with PGE Skra Bełchatów
 2011/2012  Polish SuperCup, with PGE Skra Bełchatów
 2011/2012  Polish Cup, with PGE Skra Bełchatów
 2015/2016  Polish Cup, with PGE Skra Bełchatów
 2017/2018  Polish SuperCup, with PGE Skra Bełchatów
 2017/2018  Polish Championship, with PGE Skra Bełchatów
 2018/2019  Polish SuperCup, with PGE Skra Bełchatów

Individual awards
 2017: Polish Cup – Best Defender

References

External links
 
 Player profile at PlusLiga.pl  
 Player profile at Volleybox.net

1983 births
Living people
People from Tomaszów Mazowiecki
Sportspeople from Łódź Voivodeship
Polish men's volleyball players
Skra Bełchatów players
Projekt Warsaw players
Effector Kielce players
Trefl Gdańsk players
MKS Będzin players
Outside hitters
Liberos